The Betrayal of Christ is a c. 1620 painting by the Flemish painter Anthony van Dyck. He also produced two other versions of the same subject at around the same time, now in Bristol and Minneapolis.

References

1620 paintings
Religious paintings by Anthony van Dyck
van Dyck
Paintings of the Museo del Prado by Flemish artists